Víctor Ormazábal (born April 2, 1985 in Buenos Aires) is an Argentinian footballer who most recently played for TP Hồ Chí Minh in Vietnam.  He is currently without a club.

Ormazábal came through the youth team at Argentine giants Boca Juniors to make his debut on July 6, 2003 against Rosario Central. In 2004, he was part of the Boca Juniors squad that won the Copa Sudamericana title. Ormazábal left Boca in May 2006 after making only 25 appearances for the club in all competitions.

Title

External links
 Pictures of Víctor Ormazábal on Maccabi Haifa's official website 
 Ormazaba profile 

1985 births
Living people
Footballers from Buenos Aires
Argentine footballers
Boca Juniors footballers
Maccabi Haifa F.C. players
Cádiz CF players
AD Ceuta footballers
Hanoi FC players
V.League 1 players
Argentine Primera División players
Argentine expatriate footballers
Expatriate footballers in Israel
Expatriate footballers in Vietnam
Argentine people of Basque descent
Argentine expatriate sportspeople in Israel
Argentine expatriate sportspeople in Vietnam
Association football midfielders